Walter Foster may refer to:

 Walter Foster (cricketer) (born 1915), Barbadian cricketer
 Walter Foster (mathematician), English mathematician
 Walter Edward Foster (1873–1947), Canadian politician and businessman in New Brunswick
 Walter T. Foster (1891–1981), American artist and publisher of art instruction books
 Walter Foster, 1st Baron Ilkeston (1840–1913), British physician and politician
 Walter W. V. Foster, Canadian politician

See also
 Walter Forster (disambiguation)